Sandrine Brodeur-Desrosiers is a Canadian film director and producer from Quebec. She is most noted for her 2019 short film Just Me and You (Juste moi et toi), which was a Canadian Screen Award nominee for Best Live Action Short Drama at the 8th Canadian Screen Awards, and won the Prix Iris for Best Live Action Short Film at the 22nd Quebec Cinema Awards.

Her 2021 film Fanmi, codirected with Carmine Pierre-Dufour, was named to the Toronto International Film Festival's annual year-end Canada's Top Ten list for 2021.

In 2022, Brodeur-Desrosiers directed her first feature-length film, Pas d’chicane dans ma cabane. The film, aimed at a pre-adolescent audience, premiered at the Festival du film de l'Outaouais (Outaouais Film Festival). She co-wrote the film with Maryse Latendresse.

Filmography
Un trou dans la mémoire – 2010
Soon Enough (Avant demain) – 2013
Kaupunki Etsii Klovnia – 2014
The Truck (Le Truck) – 2015
T'es pas game – 2015
Cast Off (Larguer les amarres) – 2016
Just Me and You (Juste moi et toi) – 2019
Fanmi – 2021
Pas d’chicane dans ma cabane – 2022

References

External links

21st-century Canadian screenwriters
21st-century Canadian women writers
Canadian women film directors
Canadian women film producers
Canadian women screenwriters
Canadian screenwriters in French
Film directors from Quebec
French Quebecers
Writers from Quebec
Living people
Year of birth missing (living people)